Ron Girault (born March 7, 1986) is a former American football safety. He was signed by the Kansas City Chiefs as an undrafted free agent in 2008. He played college football at Rutgers.

Girault was also a member of the New York Jets, Las Vegas Locomotives and Tampa Bay Buccaneers.

Girault attended Saint Joseph Regional High School in Montvale, New Jersey, where he led the team as a running back and a defensive back, winning the state Group III parochial title in 2003, his senior year.

Personal life
Girault has three brothers and his mother Marie was an immigrant from Haiti who raised Ron with strong traditional values.

References

External links
Just Sports Stats

1986 births
Living people
People from Spring Valley, New York
American football cornerbacks
American football safeties
American sportspeople of Haitian descent
Rutgers Scarlet Knights football players
New York Jets players
Las Vegas Locomotives players
Tampa Bay Buccaneers players
Saint Joseph Regional High School alumni